Spilosoma likiangensis is a moth in the family Erebidae. It was described by Franz Daniel in 1943. It is found in Yunnan and Guangxi in China.

References

External links
Spilosoma likiangensis at BHL

Moths described in 1943
likiangensis